Al-Fadl ibn Yahya al-Barmaki (February 766 – October/November 808) was a member of the distinguished Barmakid family, attaining high offices in the Abbasid Caliphate under Harun al-Rashid (r. 786–809).

Fadl was the eldest son of Yahya al-Barmaki, the founder of the family's fortunes. During the caliphate of Harun al-Rashid, he served as tutor to his heir, the future Caliph al-Amin (r. 809–813), and held gubernatorial positions over Tabaristan and Rayy (792–797), and over Khurasan (794/5–795/6). In these positions, he distinguished himself "by the benevolence he showed towards the inhabitants of the eastern provinces" (D. Sourdel). He fell out with Harun over his attempts to conciliate the Alids, however, and shared in his family's sudden fall from power in 803. He remained imprisoned thereafter and died at Raqqa in 808.

References

Sources
 
 

766 births
808 deaths
Governors of the Abbasid Caliphate
Barmakids
Abbasid governors of Khurasan
8th-century Iranian people
9th-century Iranian people
8th-century people from the Abbasid Caliphate
9th-century people from the Abbasid Caliphate